is a junction railway station located in the city of Ishinomaki, Miyagi, Japan, operated by East Japan Railway Company (JR East).

Lines
Ishinomaki Station is served by both the Ishinomaki Line and the Senseki Line / Senseki-Tōhoku Line, for which it is a terminal station. It is located 27.9 kilometers from the terminus of the Ishinomaki Line at Kogota Station and 49.0 kilometers from the opposing terminus of the Senseki Line at Aoba-dōri Station, and 47.2 kilometers from the end of the Senseki-Tōhoku Line at

Station layout
The station has one bay platform for the Senseki Line with two bays, and a side platform and an island platform for the Ishinomaki Line. The platforms are connected by a footbridge. The station has a "Midori no Madoguchi" staffed ticket office.

Platforms

History

Ishinomaki Station opened on October 28, 1912 on what would become the Ishinomaki Line. On November 22, 1928,  opened, served by the Miyagi Electric Railway (the present-day Senseki Line). On May 1, 1944, the Miyagi Electric Railway was nationalized and Miyaden-Ishinomaki Station was renamed Ishinomaki Station, resulting in two nearby stations both named Ishinomaki Station. On July 21, 1990, the Senseki Line and Ishinomaki Line were joined together at a single Ishinomaki Station.

Passenger statistics
In fiscal 2019, the  station was used by an average of 3,222 passengers daily (boarding passengers only).

Surrounding area

The station and surrounding streets known as "Manga Road" are adorned with statues of characters created by Shotaro Ishinomori. The entrance to the station features characters from Cyborg 009 and Kamen Rider.

See also
 List of railway stations in Japan

References

External links

 
 Hobbylink: Manga Road, Manga Land and Museums

Railway stations in Miyagi Prefecture
Senseki Line
Ishinomaki Line
Railway stations in Japan opened in 1912
Ishinomaki
Stations of East Japan Railway Company